The BT Versatility is a telephone PBX switchboard sold by BT and targeted at small businesses. It is manufactured by Taratel Communications previously Lake Communications in Ireland as the OfficeLink. In South Africa it was sold by Tellumat as the Convergence 30 or C30, in Australia it was sold as the Commander Connect, in the USA it was sold by Inter-tel as the Encore CX and by Mitel as the Mitel 3000

It has modular construction allowing a basic setup to be expanded as needed by clipping extra modules onto a backplane

The basic Central Control Unit (CCU) starts off as an 8 extension unit, with either analog POTS lines or ISDN line modules available. There is a serial connection that can be used for call logging and configuration. It can either use standard telephones or proprietary feature phones. A special Door Phone may be added on extension 23 and the system may be connected to an electronic lock relay to allow the door to be opened via a Door Phone call. Any extension may be programmed as a PA (Public Address) speaker.

It is the successor to the BT Pathway also made by Lake Communications, which superseded the BT Inspiration which in turn superseded the BT Revelation.

Technical specification

Extensions
You can have up to 40 Hybrid extensions 
Up to 8 V16 XP Consoles.

Lines
 6 ISDN 2e (12 Channels) 
 1 ISDN 30 (PRI) (15 Channels) 
 12 Analogue Lines.

Voicemail
40 Individual Mailboxes
10 Phantom Mailboxes
20 Group Boxes
1 System Mailbox

Power
Maximum Consumption: 350VA

CCU modules
Gives 8 extensions onboard and allows the following modules to be added via slots in the CCUs cover.
 Voicemail (Blue)
2-Port with 2 Hours capacity
4-Port with 4 Hours capacity
8-Port with 20 Hours capacity
 ISDN BRI module (x2) (Red)
 or a 2-Line PSTN Module (x2) (Black)
 ISDN PRI module (up to 15 channels) (Yellow)
 Router Module Connects to back plane and provides internet over ISDN Channel. Also provides DHCP/DNS/Gateway Services
The BROADBAND MODULE is equipped with a VoIP gateway with the following features:
2 endpoints which support IP trunks
Proxy server registration
Codecs - G.711, G.729
Quality of Service
Built in ADSL Modem
Redundant Internet via ISDN
 The BROADBAND MODULE PLUS is equipped with a VoIP gateway with the following features:
12 endpoints which support trunks, extensions, unified messaging or any combination of all three
Proxy server registration
Codecs - G.711, G.729
Quality of Service
Built in ADSL Modem
Redundant Internet via ISDN

The following may be installed inside the CCU.
 Music On-Hold (MOH) Module which connects to any Extension on the CCU.
 Battery Backup - requires a 7aH Sealed Lead Acid Battery to give 40mins at 11erlangs.

CCU backplane
Purchasing one of these allows up to 5 of the following modules to be added:

Ports module
Gives 8 more extensions by default and allows either:
 ISDN BRI module (x2)
 or a 2-Line PSTN Module (x2)

Options module
This allows a Central Bell and Music On-Hold as well as an external Long-Line extension (up to 2 km).

BroadBand module
On the BT Systems this allows you to connect to BT's VOIP services as trunks and provides the ability to connect VOIP extensions using the V-IP Feature Phone.

The BROADBAND MODULE has the following features:

 Wide Area Networking
 Local Area Networking - providing a 4 port hub
 Wireless Local Area Networking
 Multi-user Internet Access
 ADSL/Broadband
 ISDN
 Firewall
 VoIP Gateway supporting 2 IP trunks
 Management - via serial (v24 interface) or IP

The BROADBAND MODULE PLUS has all the above features but includes a VoIP Gateway with
12 endpoints that can be configured as IP trunks, IP extensions, or any combination of both. It
also supports Unified Messaging.

Feature phones

Default password
1111

V-Phone
This is the basic single line phone.

V-8 Phone
This has 8 speed dial keys. Required for programming.

V-16 Phone
This has 16 speed dial keys, may also be used for programming

XP Console
The V-16 may be equipped with a 32-Button XP Console. Up to 8 phones are supported with this on a system, but needs a mains adaptor for power (5V DC).

V-IP Phone
This connects to your network to link to the Broadband module, either locally or over a VPN. Requires mains power.

Wiring information
Extensions are 4-Wire hybrids, connect 2 and 5 to A and B on the CCU for standard analogue extensions and 1 and 6 to C and D for digital extensions. There are no connections to 3 and 4.

External links
BT's Product info page
Taratel Communications
Lake Communications OfficeLink
User Configuration Wizard

Miscellaneous Information
Current known highest firmware version for the CCU is 915
Current known highest firmware version for the BBM is 189
 The BBM module is notoriously unreliable on early versions of the firmware requiring frequent reboots to reconnect to the trunk.
 The BBM comes in two versions, a two port and twelve port. Both are to be avoided and best use a VoIP to PSTN trunk converter, such as a Cisco unit.

This unit was manufactured for other markets under the name of "Commander Connect", "Inter-tel Encore CX", "Tellumat Convergence 30 (C30)" & "Mitel 3000"

BT Group
Telephony equipment
Telephone exchange equipment